Ob was a  hospital ship of the Russian Navy which entered service in 1980 and was scrapped in 2007.

Development 
The four Ob-class hospital ships were designed to provide medical and recreational facilities. They were also employed as personnel transports. They have civilian crews but carry uniformed naval medical personnel. The ships are fully equipped with surgical equipment. Later two units are Project B-320 II, implying a modification to the basic design; the external differences are minor.

Construction and career
She was laid down on 17 August 1978 and launched on 12 April 1979 by Adolf Barsky shipyard. Commissioned on 28 March 1980 as a hospital ship and decommissioned on 16 August 1997. She was scrapped at Alang on 13 March 2007.

Gallery

References 

1979 ships
Hospital ships of the Soviet Union and Russia
Hospital ships
Auxiliary ships of the Russian Navy
Ob-class hospital ships